Ilanthila  is a village in the southern state of Karnataka, India. It is located in the Beltangadi taluk of Dakshina Kannada district.

Demographics
 India census, Ilanthila had a population of 5196 with 2552 males and 2644 females.

This village has a famous temple "Icchur Balasubrahmanya Swamy Temple".

See also
 Mangalore
 Dakshina Kannada
 Districts of Karnataka

References

External links
 http://Dakshina Kannada.nic.in/

Villages in Dakshina Kannada district

 
sunil ilanthila